Myzinum obscurum is a species of wasp in the family Thynnidae.

References

Further reading

External links

 

Thynnidae